Majd Homsi (born 12 December 1982 in Aleppo, Syria) is a Syrian footballer who plays as a defender for Karbalaa, which competes in the Iraqi Premier League the top division in Iraq and is currently a member of the Syria national football team.

Club career
Homsi's career began in the youth system of Al-Ittihad before starting his professional career with the senior team. He helped the club reach the final of the AFC Cup the second most important association cup in Asia. Al-Ittihad won the final against Kuwaiti Premier League champions Al-Qadsia after penalties. The game was tied 1–1 after regular time and Extra Time.

Club career statistics
Last update: 21 August 2012

International career
Homsi has been a regular for the Syria national football team since 2003.

International goals
Scores and results table. Syria's goal tally first:

Honours

Club
Al-Ittihad

 Syrian Premier League: 2004–05
 runner-up: 2001–02, 2002–03, 2006–07, 2008-09
 Syrian Cup: 2004–05, 2005–06, 2010-11
 runner-up: 2002–03, 2007–08
 AFC Cup: 2010

References

External links
 

1982 births
Living people
Sportspeople from Aleppo
Syrian footballers
Association football defenders
Syria international footballers
Al-Ittihad Aleppo players
Syrian expatriate footballers
Expatriate footballers in Iraq
Syrian expatriate sportspeople in Iraq
AFC Cup winning players
Syrian Premier League players
Himsi family